Katherine Ann Maraman (born 1951) is an American judge who has been a member of the Supreme Court of Guam since 2008. From 2017 to 2020, she served as the court's chief justice, becoming the first female chief justice on the island and across Micronesia.

Biography 
Katherine Maraman was born in Los Alamos, New Mexico, in 1951. Her mother had immigrated to the United States from Ireland, settling first in Chicago before moving to the southwest. Maraman attended Los Alamos High School, then Colorado College, where she graduated in 1973 with a degree in economics.

Having graduating from the University of New Mexico School of Law in 1976, after working briefly at the New Mexico Legislative Council Service, she moved to Guam to work for a law firm there in 1977. She now describes the island as her adoptive home. 

She subsequently served as a legal advisor to the Legislature of Guam and to Governor Joseph Franklin Ada. Then, beginning in 1994, she was appointed to the Superior Court of Guam, where she served for 14 years. During her time at the Superior Court, she primarily focused on family court cases.

Then, in 2008, she was appointed by Governor Felix Perez Camacho to serve on the Supreme Court of Guam. She is currently an associate justice, having served as chief justice from 2017 to 2020. On her election in 2017, she became Guam's first female chief justice. As a justice, her work has included efforts to improve how the courts handle mental health.

Maraman concurrently serves part-time as an associate judge on the Supreme Court of Palau. She also teaches as an adjunct professor at the University of Guam.

References 

1951 births
People from Los Alamos, New Mexico
American women judges
Chief Justices of the Supreme Court of Guam
Justices of the Supreme Court of Guam
American women lawyers
Guamanian lawyers
University of New Mexico School of Law alumni
Colorado College alumni
University of Guam faculty
Living people